Guly is a given name and a nickname. Notable people with the name include:

Andrés Guglielminpietro (born 1974, nicknamed Guly), Argentinian footballer and manager
Guly do Prado (born 1981), Brazilian footballer